Sphenomorphus capitolythos  is a species of skink found in Indonesia.

References

capitolythos
Reptiles described in 2009
Taxa named by Glenn Michael Shea
Fauna of the Maluku Islands